The English cricket team toured Bangladesh in October 2016 to play three One Day Internationals (ODIs), two Test matches and three tour matches. A terrorist attack in Dhaka four months before the tour started raised concerns about team safety. This led to two members of the England team, regular one-day captain Eoin Morgan and opener Alex Hales, to withdraw from selection.

England won the ODI series 2–1. The Test series finished 1–1, with Bangladesh recording their first ever Test win against England when they won the second Test by 108 runs. The Bangladesh captain, Mushfiqur Rahim, said that "it's a great moment for Bangladesh cricket". In response to the defeat England captain Alastair Cook said "it's not easy for me to say, but it's a good win for Bangladesh cricket".

Security concerns
Following a terrorist attack in Dhaka in July 2016, the England and Wales Cricket Board (ECB) said it would follow advice from the Bangladesh government on the forthcoming tour. In response the president of the Bangladesh Cricket Board (BCB), Nazmul Hassan, said that "England are coming after three months, by which time the situation in Bangladesh will get better". England's limited-overs captain Eoin Morgan said there were "big concerns" regarding the security of the England team following the attack. The BCB later rejected any plans to the matches at a neutral venue, should England pull out of the tour to Bangladesh. Bangladesh captain Mashrafe Mortaza said he was "hopeful" that the tour would go ahead. Zimbabwean Richard Halsall, Bangladesh's fielding coach, said that he feels safe working in Bangladesh and is hopeful of England's arrival.

In August the ECB sent a delegation to do a security inspection of venues in Mirpur, Chittagong and Fatullah. Following the inspection, the ECB confirmed that the tour would go ahead as planned. Following the confirmation that the tour would go ahead, England's director of cricket, Andrew Strauss, said that it is 100% safe to tour Bangladesh. Nazmul Hassan, the BCB president, said that the BCB would provide security for player's family members, journalists and travelling England fans.

Some England players talked about safety evaluations before confirming their participation but Moeen Ali was the first England player to confirm he would go to Bangladesh, saying "If selected, I'll definitely go". Andrew Strauss gave a deadline of 10 September 2016 for players to confirm their commitment to the tour and on 11 September the ECB announced that Alex Hales and Morgan both declined to tour. The England supporters' group, the Barmy Army, said there was "too much risk" for fans to travel to Bangladesh and later confirmed they would not be following the tour.

Jos Buttler was appointed captain of the ODI side in Morgan's absence. Buttler said that Morgan remains "very much the captain" and his choice not to tour Bangladesh "won't divide the dressing room". Morgan returned to his role of ODI captain when England tour India in November. Ahead of the ODI series, the Bangladesh Army ran a security drill to evacuate players.

Squads

James Anderson and Mark Wood withdrew from the England squads before the tour started due to injury. Jake Ball was added to the Test squad and Steven Finn to the ODI squad to replace them. Taijul Islam was added to Bangladesh's squad for the third ODI as a replacement for Mosharraf Hossain. Subashis Roy and Mosaddek Hossain were added to Bangladesh's squad for the second Test. Hossain was a backup to Sabbir Rahman while Shafiul Islam was rested. However, a few days later the Bangladesh team announced that Sabbir Rahman would be fit for the second Test.

Tour matches

One-day:Bangladesh Cricket Board Select XI vs England XI

Two-day:Bangladesh Cricket Board XI vs England XI

Two-day:Bangladesh Cricket Board XI vs England XI

ODI series

1st ODI

2nd ODI

3rd ODI

Test series

1st Test

2nd Test

References

External links
 Series home at ESPN Cricinfo

2016 in English cricket
2016 in Bangladeshi cricket
International cricket competitions in 2016–17
English cricket tours of Bangladesh